Hennigan is a surname. Notable people with the surname include:

Adrian Hennigan, British film critic
Brian Hennigan, British novelist, producer and director
Charlie Hennigan (1935–2017), American football player
Gavan Hennigan, Irish Extreme Environment Athlete
Gilbert Franklin Hennigan (1883–1960), US senator instrumental in the creation of McNeese State University as a four-year college
James W. Hennigan Jr. (1927–2020), American lawyer and politician
James W. Hennigan Sr. (1890–1969), American businessman and politician
John Hennigan (politician), Irish politician and farmer
John Hennigan (poker player) (born 1970), American professional poker player from Philadelphia, Pennsylvania
John Morrison (wrestler), (born John Hennigan, 1979), American former professional wrestler
Maura Hennigan, the Clerk Magistrate of the Suffolk County, Massachusetts Superior Court Criminal/Business Division
Mike Hennigan (born 1942), English former professional football player and manager
Mike Hennigan (American football), American football player and coach
Phil Hennigan (1946–2016), right-handed former Major League Baseball pitcher
Rob Hennigan, American basketball executive and former general manager of the Orlando Magic

In popular culture
 Hennigan's Scotch, a fictional brand of Scotch whisky introduced in the Seinfeld episode "The Red Dot"

See also
Morgan v. Hennigan, the case that defined the school busing controversy in Boston, Massachusetts during the 1970s

Surnames of Irish origin